Klaus Schulze (3 January 1928 – 16 April 2013) was a German rower. He competed in the men's coxed four event at the 1952 Summer Olympics.

References

1928 births
2013 deaths
German male rowers
Olympic rowers of Germany
Rowers at the 1952 Summer Olympics
Sportspeople from Halle (Saale)